The Tour de Gironde is a road bicycle race held annually in France. It was organised as a 2.2 event on the UCI Europe Tour from 2005 to 2017. Since 2018, it has been a junior event.

Winners

References

External links

UCI Europe Tour races
Cycle races in France
1975 establishments in France
Recurring sporting events established in 1975